Ruth Hutchinson is a Canadian former figure skater.

Results

References
skatabase

Canadian female single skaters
Living people
Year of birth missing (living people)
Place of birth missing (living people)